Budd is an unincorporated community in section 2 of Sunbury Township, Livingston County, Illinois, United States. Budd has ZIP code 61313.

History
Budd was situated on the Three-I Railroad (now CSX), nearly midway between the cities of Streator and Dwight. In 1909, William Cahill was in charge of the town's grain elevator and John Hughes ran a general store. There was also a post office which is no longer open.

References

Unincorporated communities in Livingston County, Illinois
Unincorporated communities in Illinois